The following radio stations broadcast on AM frequency 1370 kHz: 1370 AM is a regional broadcast frequency, on which Class B and D stations broadcast.

Argentina
 LRA 54 in Ingeniero Jacobacci, Rio Negro
 Trece 70 in Isidro Casanova, Buenos Aires
 Assigned frequency to Rafaela (Santa Fe). Still have no call sign assigned)

Mexico
 XECCBI-AM in Huamantla, Tlaxcala
 XEHG-AM in Mexicali, Baja California
 XEPJ-AM in Guadalajara, Jalisco, licensed in San Pedro Tlaquepaque, Jalisco

United States

Uruguay
 CX 42 Emisora Ciudad de Montevideo

References

Lists of radio stations by frequency